Mepixanox (Pimexone) is a respiratory stimulant.

References

Phenol ethers
1-Piperidinyl compounds
Respiratory agents
Xanthones